Jacob Golomb (Hebrew: יעקב גולומב) is a professor of philosophy at The Hebrew University of Jerusalem.

He specializes in Continental philosophy of the 19th and 20th centuries, phenomenology, hermeneutics, psychoanalysis, philosophy and literature; Philosophy of Zionism and Jewish modern philosophy. Professor Golomb is currently acting as the Philosophical Editor of the Hebrew University Magnes Press and is a member of its academic committee.

References

External links
 
 Google Scholar results
 Google Books comes up with 240 hits.

Academic staff of the Hebrew University of Jerusalem
Year of birth missing (living people)
Living people